Pine Bluff 20B is an Indian reserve of the Cumberland House Cree Nation in Saskatchewan. It is 60 kilometres southwest of Flin Flon, and on the north shore of the Saskatchewan River.

References

Indian reserves in Saskatchewan
Division No. 18, Saskatchewan